Herederos de la bestia is a 2016 Spanish documentary film directed by Diego López and David Pizarro, released on 5 May 2017. It is the first film directed by both directors.

This film is a documentary on the 1995 film El día de la bestia, directed by Álex de la Iglesia. Except Álex Angulo, who died in 2014, all cast involved in this film appear in the documentary.

It was released at the Sitges Film Festival, the Zinema Zombie Fest de Colombia, the Ventana Sur de Argentina and the Masacre en Xoco de México.

Cast

Awards and nominations 
Herederos de la bestia has won the Premio al Documental en el PAURA at the Festival Internacional de Cine de Terror de Valencia.

References

External links 
 
 
 

Spanish documentary films
2016 documentary films
2016 films
2010s Spanish films
2010s Spanish-language films